Omorgus litigiosus is a beetle of the family Trogidae.

litigiosus